In mathematics, the Fuglede−Kadison determinant of an invertible operator in a finite factor is a positive real number associated with it. It defines a multiplicative homomorphism from the set of invertible operators to the set of positive real numbers.

Definition
 
(cf. Relation between determinant and trace via eigenvalues). The number  is well-defined by continuous functional calculus.

Properties
  for invertible operators ,
  for 

Extensions to singular operators
All of them must assign a value of 0 to operators with non-trivial nullspace.

Algebraic extension

Analytic extension
This extension satisfies the continuity property
 for

Generalizations

References

 .

 .

Von Neumann algebras